Kerophora is a genus of flies in the family Phoridae.

Species
K. brunnea Brown, 1988
K. ferruginea Brown, 1988
K. sicula Brown, 1988

References

Phoridae
Platypezoidea genera